Galant is a surname. Notable people with the surname include:

Jacqueline Galant (born 1974), Belgian politician
Martyna Galant (born 1995), Polish athlete
Rashaad Galant (1947–2014), South African cricketer
Yoav Galant (born 1958), Israeli general and politician

See also
Gallant (surname)